William Robert Hurst (4 March 1921 – December 2005) was an English professional footballer who played as a winger.

References

1921 births
2005 deaths
People from Brierfield, Lancashire
English footballers
Association football midfielders
Burnley F.C. players
Plymouth Argyle F.C. players
Nelson F.C. players
Bury F.C. players
Northwich Victoria F.C. players
Accrington Stanley F.C. (1891) players
English Football League players